Abū Marwān Ḥayyān ibn Khalaf ibn Ḥusayn ibn Ḥayyān al-Qurṭubī (987–1075), usually known as Ibn Hayyan, was a Muslim historian from Al-Andalus.

Born at Córdoba, his father was an important official at the court of the Andalusian ruler al-Mansur, and published several works on history which have only survived in part. His books constitute one of the most important sources for the study of the Andalusian history, especially the history of Córdoba, and the kings of the taifas. His work also provides an early reference to Viking raiders, called Majus by him.

Like Ibn Hazm he defended the dynasty of the Umayyads and deplored its fall and the following dissolution of the Andalusian state and the coming of the taifas.

He died in Córdoba in 1075.

Works
The following works are ascribed to Ibn Hayyan: 
Tarikh Fuqaha Qurtuba
Al-Kitab al ladi Jama'a fihi bayna Kitbay al-Qubbashi wa Ibn Afif
Intijab al-Jamil li Ma'athir Banu Khatab
Al-Akhbar fi'l Dawla al-Amiriya (in 100 volumes)
Al-Batsha al-Kubra (in ten volumes).
Al-Muqtabis fi Tarikh al-Andalus (in ten volumes)
Kitab al-Matin.

His best-known works are al-Muqtabis and al-Matin.

References

Abd al-Rahman al-Hajji (ed.), Al-Muqtabis. Beirut: 1965. Partial Spanish translation in F. Corriente and M.J. Viguera, Cronica del Califa Abdurrahmen III entre les anos 912 y 942 (Zaragoza, 1981)
David J. Wasserstein. The Caliphate in the West: An Islamic Political Institution in the Iberian Peninsula.

External links
Muslim Heritage.com: Historians in North Africa and Spain

987 births
1075 deaths
11th-century Arabic writers
11th-century historians from al-Andalus
Court scholars
11th-century writers from al-Andalus
People from Córdoba, Spain